This is a list of graffiti and street art injuries and deaths.

Descriptions of graffiti and street art injuries and deaths 
There were six people who died creating graffiti on train carriages in New South Wales by 1988.
Nine people were seriously injured or died creating graffiti on railway property in New South Wales in the 18 months prior to December 2001.

In July 1988 in the London Underground there were people who had received "... electric shocks and burns crossing the 600-volt rails to tag a wall." In June 2008 in Los Angeles there had been "...taggers getting injured once every couple of months from falls or being 'clipped by a car'.".

When people have taken photos of newly created graffiti there have been accidents where deaths have occurred. In the United States in 1993 a 23-year-old person was on train tracks with a group of people and it is thought that they had spray painted graffiti on the side of a freight carriage. The 23 year-old was taking photos of the graffiti when the sound of an approaching train was heard. The 23 year-old began to move across the train tracks and a collision occurred with the train and they died.

In Russia in 2020 a 22-year-old had created graffiti at a train station and they climbed up onto a train carriage to take a photo of the graffiti they had completed and they received an electric shock and died.

Graffiti and street art injuries and deaths

Gallery

See also 

 Graffiti
 List of selfie-related injuries and deaths
 List of train surfing injuries and deaths
 Rooftopping
 Street art
 Urban Exploration

References 

Graffiti and street art injuries and deaths
Graffiti and street art injuries and deaths
Graffiti and street art injuries and deaths
Graffiti and street art injuries and deaths
Graffiti
Graffiti and street art injuries and deaths